The Agin-Buryat Constituency (No.215) was a Russian legislative constituency in Agin-Buryat Autonomous Okrug in 1993-2007. In 2008 Agin-Buryat AO was merged with Chita Oblast to form Zabaykalsky Krai. As of today, the territory of the former Agin-Buryat constituency is part of the Dauria constituency.

Members elected

Election results

1993

|-
! colspan=2 style="background-color:#E9E9E9;text-align:left;vertical-align:top;" |Candidate
! style="background-color:#E9E9E9;text-align:left;vertical-align:top;" |Party
! style="background-color:#E9E9E9;text-align:right;" |Votes
! style="background-color:#E9E9E9;text-align:right;" |%
|-
|style="background-color:"|
|align=left|Bair Zhamsuev
|align=left|Independent
|
|48.97%
|-
|style="background-color:"|
|align=left|Tsyren Nimbuev
|align=left|Independent
| - 
|22.75%
|-
| colspan="5" style="background-color:#E9E9E9;"|
|- style="font-weight:bold"
| colspan="3" style="text-align:left;" | Total
| 
| 100%
|-
| colspan="5" style="background-color:#E9E9E9;"|
|- style="font-weight:bold"
| colspan="4" |Source:
|
|}

1995

|-
! colspan=2 style="background-color:#E9E9E9;text-align:left;vertical-align:top;" |Candidate
! style="background-color:#E9E9E9;text-align:left;vertical-align:top;" |Party
! style="background-color:#E9E9E9;text-align:right;" |Votes
! style="background-color:#E9E9E9;text-align:right;" |%
|-
|style="background-color:"|
|align=left|Bair Zhamsuev (incumbent)
|align=left|Independent
|
|37.63%
|-
|style="background-color:"|
|align=left|Bair Tushimilov
|align=left|Independent
|
|36.38%
|-
|style="background-color:"|
|align=left|Tatyana Fomenko
|align=left|Independent
|
|14.96%
|-
|style="background-color:"|
|align=left|Maria Rozhkova
|align=left|Independent
|
|5.88%
|-
|style="background-color:"|
|align=left|Erdem Tsybikzhapov
|align=left|Independent
|
|0.60%
|-
|style="background-color:#000000"|
|colspan=2 |against all
|
|2.99%
|-
| colspan="5" style="background-color:#E9E9E9;"|
|- style="font-weight:bold"
| colspan="3" style="text-align:left;" | Total
| 
| 100%
|-
| colspan="5" style="background-color:#E9E9E9;"|
|- style="font-weight:bold"
| colspan="4" |Source:
|
|}

1997

|-
! colspan=2 style="background-color:#E9E9E9;text-align:left;vertical-align:top;" |Candidate
! style="background-color:#E9E9E9;text-align:left;vertical-align:top;" |Party
! style="background-color:#E9E9E9;text-align:right;" |Votes
! style="background-color:#E9E9E9;text-align:right;" |%
|-
|style="background-color:"|
|align=left|Iosif Kobzon
|align=left|Independent
|
|86.77%
|-
|style="background-color:"|
|align=left|Vladimir Chimitdorzhin
|align=left|Independent
|
|2.88%
|-
|style="background-color:"|
|align=left|Vladimir Grishin
|align=left|Independent
|
|2.57%
|-
|style="background-color:"|
|align=left|Bator Zhigzhitzhapov
|align=left|Independent
|
|2.20%
|-
|style="background-color:"|
|align=left|Boris Rabdano
|align=left|Independent
|
|1.25%
|-
|style="background-color:"|
|align=left|Aleksandr Morozov
|align=left|Independent
|
|0.43%
|-
|style="background-color:#000000"|
|colspan=2 |against all
|
|1.83%
|-
| colspan="5" style="background-color:#E9E9E9;"|
|- style="font-weight:bold"
| colspan="3" style="text-align:left;" | Total
| 
| 100%
|-
| colspan="5" style="background-color:#E9E9E9;"|
|- style="font-weight:bold"
| colspan="4" |Source:
|
|}

1999

|-
! colspan=2 style="background-color:#E9E9E9;text-align:left;vertical-align:top;" |Candidate
! style="background-color:#E9E9E9;text-align:left;vertical-align:top;" |Party
! style="background-color:#E9E9E9;text-align:right;" |Votes
! style="background-color:#E9E9E9;text-align:right;" |%
|-
|style="background-color:"|
|align=left|Iosif Kobzon (incumbent)
|align=left|Independent
|
|91.21%
|-
|style="background-color:"|
|align=left|Tsyrendorzhi Damdinov
|align=left|Yabloko
|
|3.13%
|-
|style="background-color:"|
|align=left|Valery Sodboev
|align=left|Independent
|
|2.75%
|-
| colspan="5" style="background-color:#E9E9E9;"|
|- style="font-weight:bold"
| colspan="3" style="text-align:left;" | Total
| 
| 100%
|-
| colspan="5" style="background-color:#E9E9E9;"|
|- style="font-weight:bold"
| colspan="4" |Source:
|
|}

2003

|-
! colspan=2 style="background-color:#E9E9E9;text-align:left;vertical-align:top;" |Candidate
! style="background-color:#E9E9E9;text-align:left;vertical-align:top;" |Party
! style="background-color:#E9E9E9;text-align:right;" |Votes
! style="background-color:#E9E9E9;text-align:right;" |%
|-
|style="background-color:"|
|align=left|Iosif Kobzon (incumbent)
|align=left|Independent
|
|82.12%
|-
|style="background-color:"|
|align=left|Bair Dorzhiev
|align=left|Independent
|
|9.82%
|-
|style="background-color:"|
|align=left|Tsyrendorzhi Damdinov
|align=left|Yabloko
|
|2.31%
|-
|style="background-color:"|
|align=left|Dorzho Tumunbayarov
|align=left|Communist Party
|
|1.87%
|-
|style="background-color:"|
|align=left|Lubsan Sukhodaev
|align=left|Liberal Democratic Party
|
|0.92%
|-
|style="background-color:"|
|align=left|Aleksandr Ivanov
|align=left|Independent
|
|0.77%
|-
|style="background-color:#000000"|
|colspan=2 |against all
|
|1.18%
|-
| colspan="5" style="background-color:#E9E9E9;"|
|- style="font-weight:bold"
| colspan="3" style="text-align:left;" | Total
| 
| 100%
|-
| colspan="5" style="background-color:#E9E9E9;"|
|- style="font-weight:bold"
| colspan="4" |Source:
|
|}

Notes

References

Obsolete Russian legislative constituencies
Politics of Agin-Buryat Autonomous Okrug
Politics of Zabaykalsky Krai